Tommeløyane (Thumb Islands) is a group of islands in Hinlopen Strait, Svalbard. They are located towards Lomfjordhalvøya, and west of Fosterøyane. Among the islands in the group are Strilane, Tommelen and Steiløya.

References

Islands of Svalbard